Podaná is a Greek argot based on rearranging syllables, similar to Verlan and Vesre. Podaná itself is a reversal of anápoda, meaning "upside-down."

References

Cant languages
Greek slang
Language games